Robert Lee Will (July 15, 1931 – August 11, 2011) was an American professional baseball player who played outfielder in the Major Leagues between  and  for the Chicago Cubs.

He attended Mankato State University and Northwestern University, and started his pro career in 1954 in the Cubs' farm system. Will had a highly successful career in minor league baseball, hitting .333 lifetime in 934 games. He was the 1959 Most Valuable Player of the Triple-A American Association, a season during which he hit .336 and led the league in hits (203) and runs scored (101).

Will played all or parts of six seasons for the Cubs, seeing his only consistent playing time in 1960, when he appeared in 117 games as the Cubs' regular right fielder. Overall, he appeared in 410 MLB games, and collected 202 hits, batting .247. His professional career ended after the 1964 campaign.

Bob Will died from cancer on August 11, 2011.

External links

 Robert L. Will Obituary, August 14, 2011, Chicago Tribune

1931 births
2011 deaths
American Association (1902–1997) MVP Award winners
Baseball players from Illinois
Burlington Bees players
Chicago Cubs players
Deaths from cancer in Illinois
Fort Worth Cats players
Jacksonville Suns players
Major League Baseball outfielders
Minnesota State University, Mankato alumni
Northwestern Wildcats baseball players
People from Berwyn, Illinois
People from Woodstock, Illinois
Portland Beavers players
Salt Lake City Bees players
Sportspeople from the Chicago metropolitan area
Tulsa Oilers (baseball) players
American expatriate baseball players in Cuba
Habana players
21st-century African-American people